Ordoño Álvarez (Asturias,  –  21 December 1285) was an Asturian clergyman, abbot at the Abbey of Santa María de Husillos, bishop of Salamanca, archbishop of Braga and cardenal of the Roman Catholic Church.

Family origins 
Ordoño Álvarez was a member of the House of Noreña, often referred to as the House of Nava, one of the most noble and ancient houses of Asturias, descendant of the infantes Ordoño Ramírez and Cristina Bermúdez. His father was Álvar Díaz who accompanied King Ferdinand III of Castile in the siege of Seville in 1248 and governed several tenancies including Siero, Nava, Aguilar and other localities. Ordoño's paternal grandfather was his namesake, Ordoño Álvarez de las Asturias, an important magnate during the reign of King Alfonso IX of León who participated in the conquest of Córdoba in 1236, and who was appointed mayor of Jaén and in charge of the repartimiento, or distribution of the conquered land.

Álvar had married Teresa Pérez Girón, daughter of Pedro Rodríguez Girón and his wife Sancha Peres de Lumiares, daughter of the Portuguese noble Pedro Afonso de Ribadouro, tenente of Neiva (1187) and Trancoso (1184), and his wife Urraca Afonso, an illegitimate daughter of Afonso I of Portugal. One of Ordoño's brothers was Pedro Álvarez de las Asturias, the father of Rodrigo Álvarez de las Asturias, count of Noreña, tutor of King Henry II of Castile who inherited the lordship of Noreña.

Ecclesiastical career 
He was appointed abbot of Santa María de Husillos on 1 July 1273 by Pope Gregory X and held this post until 13 July 1281. In this capacity, he attended the Second Council of Lyon in 1274. Ordoño was Archbishop of Braga from 1275 to 1278 and is also recorded as the bishop of Salamanca in 1281. On 12 March 1278, he was created cardinal by Pope Nicholas III and appointed Suburbicarian Bishop of Frascati, participating in the papal conclaves of 1280 and 1285 when Martin IV and Honorius IV were elected popes.

Death and burial 
Álvarez died in Rome in 1285 and was probably buried in the cloister of the Old Cathedral of Salamanca, as recorded in several documents.

References

Bibliography

 
 

 

 
 

Deans of the College of Cardinals
Spanish cardinals
Cardinal-bishops of Frascati
Roman Catholic archbishops of Braga
13th-century Roman Catholic archbishops in Portugal
1230 births
1285 deaths
13th-century cardinals